Joe Barnhill (born June 13, 1965, in Turkey, Texas) is an American country music singer-songwriter. Between 1990 and 1997, Barnhill released 2 studio albums. He also charted two singles on the Billboard Hot Country Singles & Tracks chart. His highest charting single, "Your Old Flame's Goin' Out Tonite," peaked at No. 56 in 1989.

His self-titled debut album was praised by one critic for its "excellent" selections of songs including a cover of Paul Overstreet's "Becky Morgan (Cotton Pickin' Time)".

As a songwriter, Barnhill along with Wayne Perry wrote "Not a Moment Too Soon," a No. 1 hit for Tim McGraw in 1994.

Discography

Albums

Singles

Notes:
A "Any Ole Time" did not chart on Hot Country Songs, but peaked at No. 8 on Hot Country Radio Breakouts.

References

External links
[ Joe Barnhill] at Allmusic

1965 births
American country singer-songwriters
American male singer-songwriters
Living people
Country musicians from Texas
Singer-songwriters from Texas